Mochan may refer to:

Mochan, Iran, a village in Razavi Khorasan Province, Iran

People with the surname
Charles Mochan, Scottish footballer
Dennis Mochan (b. 1935), Scottish footballer
Neil Mochan (1927-1994), Scottish footballer
Scot Mochan DJ, Producer, Actor